2057 is the first of the two debut solo EPs by American rapper and record producer J57. Released simultaneously along with The Ports, 2057 features vocal appearances from notable artistes including DJ Brace, Sene, Homeboy Sandman, Rob Kelly, Soul Khan, Koncept, Silent Knight and Theory Hazit.

Track listing

Release history

References

2012 EPs
J57 EPs